Meli Koliavu is a Fijian rugby league player who represented Fiji.

Playing career
Koliavu attended St. Patrick's College and represented the Wellington Orcas in the 2006 and 2007 Bartercard Cups.

In 2008 Koliavu signed with the New Zealand Warriors Toyota Cup team alongside fellow Orcas Ben Matulino and Alehana Mara.

Between 2008 and 2010 Koliavu also played for the Auckland Vulcans in the NSW Cup and the Richmond Bulldogs in the Auckland Rugby League competition. At the end of the 2009 season Koliavu was no longer eligible for the under-20 side and the New Zealand Warriors failed to offer him a senior squad contract.

Representative career
Koliavu was a Junior Kiwi in 2006 and played for the New Zealand Under-18's in 2007.

Koliavu represented Fiji at the 2009 Pacific Cup.

References

1989 births
Living people
Fijian rugby league players
Fiji national rugby league team players
New Zealand people of I-Taukei Fijian descent
People educated at St. Patrick's College, Wellington
Junior Kiwis players
I-Taukei Fijian people
Fijian emigrants to New Zealand
Rugby league centres
Rugby league wingers
Wellington rugby league team players